Christopher Charles Mintz-Plasse (born June 20, 1989) is an American actor and comedian. He has performed roles such as Fogell (McLovin) in Superbad (2007), Augie Farcques in Role Models (2008), and Chris D'Amico in Kick-Ass (2010) and its sequel Kick-Ass 2 (2013).

Mintz-Plasse provided voice acting for Fishlegs Ingerman in the How to Train Your Dragon franchise (2010–2019) and King Gristle Jr. in Trolls (2016).

Early life 
Mintz-Plasse was born in Woodland Hills, Los Angeles, where he attended El Camino Real High School, performing on its improv comedy team. He is the son of Ellen Mintz, a school counselor, and Ray Plasse, a postal worker. He is Jewish on his mother's side, whereas his father is from a Catholic family.

Career 
When auditioning for the part of Fogell in his film debut Superbad, he had no professional head shots and instead took one with his camera phone. Because he was 17 at the time and still a minor, his mother was required by law to be on set while he filmed his sex scene in the movie. Upon release, the film earned critical and commercial success, with many critics citing Mintz-Plasse's performance as a highlight; he received a nomination for the MTV Movie Award for Best Breakthrough Performance.

In 2008, Mintz-Plasse next appeared with Paul Rudd and Seann William Scott in David Wain's film Role Models as Augie Farques, a nerdy teenager obsessed with medieval live-action role-playing games. He also made a small guest appearance on an episode of David Wain's internet series, Wainy Days. He then starred in Harold Ramis's film Year One, as a comedic version of the biblical figure Isaac. He also appeared in a short film titled The Tale of RJ which ended up becoming the basis for the television series The Hard Times of RJ Berger.

The next year, he voiced Fishlegs in the animated film How to Train Your Dragon. In April 2010, he appeared in Kick-Ass as the superhero Red Mist, a.k.a. Chris D'Amico, which was planned to be a minor role until director Matthew Vaughn saw Mintz-Plasse audition and his capabilities. Mintz-Plasse originally auditioned for the role of Kick-Ass, but when the producers believed that his acting was too loud and obnoxious they immediately gave him the role of Red Mist instead.

In May 2010, he guest-starred in an episode of Party Down as Kent, a friend of the character Roman. He performed his second voice-over that month in the film Marmaduke, as the stylized dog Giuseppe. The same year he was featured in two music videos, Kid Cudi's "Erase Me", featuring Kanye West, and the indie rock band The Soft Pack's "Answer to Yourself".

In 2011, Mintz-Plasse appeared in Fright Night—a remake of the 1985 film—as Edward Lee, former best friend of Charley Brewster, played by Anton Yelchin. At first he was reluctant to accept the role as it was a remake, but he accepted after reading the script and seeing the talent involved.

In 2012, he voiced the bullying student Alvin in the animated film, ParaNorman. The same year he also had a small role in the film Pitch Perfect as Tommy, the university's audition launcher. He then starred in a short film, "Would You", written by his Fright Night co-star Dave Franco and premiered at the SXSW Film Festival. Mintz-Plasse was supposed to play the lead role in the CBS sitcom Friend Me and even filmed several episodes, but before the series could air, it was cancelled after series creator Alan Kirschenbaum died by suicide. As a promotion for the video game Far Cry 3, he starred in The Far Cry Experience, a series of online videos, as a fictional version of himself trapped on an island controlled by a psychopathic pirate named Vaas.

He reprised his role of Chris D'Amico in the sequel Kick-Ass 2, which was released in August 2013. Mintz-Plasse found the role to be darker than any other he had portrayed to date, and hired an acting coach to help him with the more intense scenes. He made his third music video appearance in the Unknown Mortal Orchestra's music video "So Good at Being in Trouble".

He and his Kick-Ass co-star Chloë Grace Moretz starred in a short segment, "Middle School Date", in the film Movie 43. He also had small roles in Seth Rogen and Evan Goldberg's This Is the End, playing a fictional version of himself, and in the romantic comedy film The To Do List, with Aubrey Plaza.

In September 2013, Mintz-Plasse and Dave Franco set out on a week-long road trip across America to promote the technology company LG's "It's All Possible" campaign for its flagship smartphone, the LG G2. The actors documented their process and broadcast it on Funny or Die. Mintz-Plasse had a supporting role as college fraternity student Scoonie in the 2014 hit comedy film Neighbors and reprised his role as Fishlegs in the animated sequel How to Train Your Dragon 2. He reprises his role of Fishlegs in the DreamWorks Dragons television series, which aired on Cartoon Network and Netflix.

Mintz-Plasse played drums for the rock band The Young Rapscallions, which split after eight years in 2015. He then founded the band Bear on Fire, in which he plays bass guitar.

Filmography

Film

Television

Music videos

Awards and nominations

References

External links 
 

1989 births
21st-century American drummers
21st-century American male actors
American male film actors
American male television actors
American male voice actors
American rock drummers
El Camino Real High School alumni
Jewish American male actors
Living people
People from Woodland Hills, Los Angeles
21st-century American Jews